Zeta Delphini (ζ Delphini) is a star in the constellation of Delphinus. With an apparent magnitude of about 4.6, it is faintly visible to the naked eye. Parallax measurements of the system made by the Hipparcos spacecraft put it at a distance of about 220 light-years, or 67 parsecs.

Zeta Delphini has a spectral type of A3V, implying it is an A-type main-sequence star. These types of stars are bluish-white colored, and have effective temperatures between 7100 and 11500 K: Zeta Delphini has a temperature of 8336 K. Its age is estimated to be around 500 million years, considerably younger than the Sun.

In 2014, the discovery of a brown dwarf around Zeta Delphini was announced. Zeta Delphini B is a brown dwarf with a spectral type of L5 (but may be from L3 to L7), and has a mass of about 55 Jupiters. At over 13 arcseconds away, this brown dwarf is separated at least 910 AU from Zeta Delphini.

References

External links

Delphinus (constellation)
A-type main-sequence stars
Delphini, Zeta
101589
Delphini, 04
Brown dwarfs
196180
7871
Durchmusterung objects
L-type stars